Cobhlaith (older spelling: Cobhfhlaith) is an Irish language female given name believed to mean 'victorious sovereignty'. This name was relatively common in the early Irish period and has on occasion been anglicised as 'Cowley'. People with the name include:

 Cobhlaith ingen Canonn
 Cobhlaith ingen Ceallaich Cualann, Princess of Leinster
 Cobhlaith ingen Cathail, Abbess of Cluana Cuibhtin
 Cobhlaith ingen Duibh Duin, Abbess of Kildare
 Cobhlaith Mór Ní Conchobhair, Princess of Connacht

References

Irish-language feminine given names